Pooka was the former songwriting duo of UK guitarists/vocalists Sharon Lewis and Natasha Jones. They took their name from Púca, a mythical Irish goblin with an uneven temper.

Career
Pooka were formed early in 1992 at Nottingham Polytechnic. After only a few months of forming the band Lewis and Jones decided to try their luck in London to find a record company to work with. They did this by visiting record companies in person, guitars in hand, and performing their songs live to various talent scouts. This eventually led to their gaining a 5 album recording contract with WEA. Pooka's eponymous debut album (produced by John Coxon) was released in 1993 on WEA (Elektra in the USA).

Tours with Everything But The Girl, Tindersticks, Kristin Hersh, Al Stewart and The Levellers followed and, between recording their own material, Pooka co-wrote tracks with Ultramarine found upon their 1995 release Bel Air, and a track for Orbital, "Otono", released on their 1999 album The Middle of Nowhere.

Pooka's second album, Spinning, was released in September 1997 on Trade 2, a subsidiary of Island Records and managed by ex-Rough Trade founder Geoff Travis.

Garnering praise and support while on tour throughout Europe in the next two years, Pooka released a five-song EP, Monday Mourning, in 1999 on the French Telescopic Records label. In 2001, Lewis and Jones independently released Fools Give Birth To Angels, a self-produced, classically written and arranged collection of new songs, replete with string sections and a hand bell choir. Only 1,000 copies of the CD were produced.

Soon thereafter, their ten-year musical partnership came to an abrupt end, but not before the Rough Trade release of their fourth album Shift. Both Jones and Lewis continue to play live, and have since each released two solo albums.

Discography

References

External links
Sharon Lewis's homepage
Natasha Lea Jones's homepage

English folk musical groups
Musical groups from Manchester
English musical duos
Folk music duos
Female musical duos